The National Park School District is a community public school district that serves students in pre-kindergarten through sixth grade from National Park, in Gloucester County, New Jersey, United States.

As of the 2018–19 school year, the district, comprising one school, had an enrollment of 274 students and 24.8 classroom teachers (on an FTE basis), for a student–teacher ratio of 11.0:1.

The district is classified by the New Jersey Department of Education as being in District Factor Group "B", the second lowest of eight groupings. District Factor Groups organize districts statewide to allow comparison by common socioeconomic characteristics of the local districts. From lowest socioeconomic status to highest, the categories are A, B, CD, DE, FG, GH, I and J.

For seventh through twelfth grade, public school students attend Gateway Regional High School, a regional public high school serving students from the boroughs of National Park, Wenonah, Westville and Woodbury Heights, as part of the Gateway Regional High School District. As of the 2018–19 school year, the high school had an enrollment of 879 students and 81.5 classroom teachers (on an FTE basis), for a student–teacher ratio of 10.8:1.

School
National Park Elementary School served 270 students in grades PreK-6 as of the 2018–19 school year.
Carla E. Bittner, Principal

Administration
Core members of the district's administration are:
Shannon Whalen, Superintendent
Donna Contrevo, Business Administrator / Board Secretary

Board of education
The district's board of education, with nine members, sets policy and oversees the fiscal and educational operation of the district through its administration. As a Type II school district, the board's trustees are elected directly by voters to serve three-year terms of office on a staggered basis, with three seats up for election each year held (since 2012) as part of the November general election.

References

External links
National Park School District

Data for National Park School District, National Center for Education Statistics

National Park, New Jersey
New Jersey District Factor Group B
School districts in Gloucester County, New Jersey
Public elementary schools in New Jersey